Truly Madly Deeply... Memoirs of a Broken Heart's First Love! is a romance novel written by Indian author Faraaz Kazi. It was first published in 2010 by Cedar publishers. The book was republished again in October 2012 and went on to become a national award-winning title apart from becoming the first book by an Indian author to win the Goodreads Choice Award for Best Debut (Romance). It remains the only Indian book in the Top 100 YA Global Fiction list.

Plot
After moving to Philadelphia from Mumbai, India, teen Rahul Kapoor has difficulty coping with what seems to be the loss of a loved one. Upon enrolling into Delaware Valley High School, Rahul is introduced to Sahil, an American born Indian who is assigned the task of familiarizing Rahul with his new schooling.

References

Other sources
"High on feelings", The Hindu, June 8, 2011
"Even Chetan Bhagat is cashing in on publicity: Faraaz Kazi", Mumbai Mirror, September 2, 2011
"Romance, horror and a little more", Absolute India (Indian newspaper), January 12, 2014
"Their Words Are Mightier", Daily Post (Indian newspaper), December 16, 2013
"'Truly Madly Deeply' a coming-of-age romcom", IBN Live, August 29, 2011
"Romancing the reader", Shillong Times, March 10, 2013. Quote: "Kazi is rated amongst the top romance writers in India."
"Lime Light: Bookmark", The Telegraph (Calcutta), December 30, 2012 
"‘Can’t call it a masala entertainer’", The New Indian Express, 6 June 2011
"The Lovey-Dovey Boys", OPEN magazine. 21 April 2012.

2010 novels
Young adult novels